= Green Puerto Rico =

Series of green reforms

Green Puerto Rico is an umbrella term used to describe a pair of sustainable and renewable energy reforms that were signed into law on July 19, 2010 by Luis Fortuño during his governance of Puerto Rico. Two principle policies were developed in an effort to improve the Puerto Rican economy and to protect the environment. The first was aimed at decreasing Puerto Rico’s energy dependence on fossil fuels and increasing the development and ultimate use of renewable energy sources. This policy is titled Public Policy on Energy Diversification by Means of Sustainable and Alternative Renewable Energy in Puerto Rico Act. The second policy focuses on long-term economic savings and is titled the Green Energy Incentives Act of Puerto Rico. Both acts were designed to foster development and use of renewable energy sources to replace non-renewable energy sources such as oil. Energy policy in Puerto Rico has traditionally emphasized oil, but has made some strides over the last two decades with Green Puerto Rico which is an important step towards development and implementation of renewable energy in Puerto Rico.

== Policy history ==
In 2004, the Renewable Energy Development Act (REDA) was passed into law. It provides tax exemptions for companies dedicated to producing renewable energy on the island. An amendment to REDA was promulgated in 2008 and it created a program for tax exemptions as well as incentives for continuing work on development of solar power and other renewable energies. There is a stark contrast in energy production between non-renewable and renewable energy sources in Puerto Rico. In 2016, more than half of electricity generated on the island still came from imported natural gas and coal as compared to 2.4% of electricity which was generated from renewable sources of energy.

== Policy implementation ==
In 2010, the Public Policy on Energy Diversification by Means of Sustainable and Alternative Renewable Energy in Puerto Rico Act created more formal regulations with new Renewable Portfolio Standards (RPS). The aim of these standards is to maintain use of incentives as motivation for continuing to develop renewable energy goals into the future. The RPS require electrical companies to limit the energy produced from non-renewable methods to 80% over the course of 25 years and, as a result, increase the development and use of renewable energy sources. In the same year, Governor Fortuño signed the Green Energy Incentives Act of Puerto Rico into law. A Green Energy Fund originated from this policy. The purpose of this policy was to assist in new projects of electrical companies that would keep them in compliance with the RPS from the companion policy. The major goals of the two principle policies are to provide renewable energy incentives for construction projects in Puerto Rico and to provide tax benefits for those working on large or small projects.

== Green Puerto Rico policy development after 2010 ==
In 2014, the Transformation and Energy Relief Act was passed resulting in the creation of the Puerto Rico Energy Commission (PREC) which supervises the Puerto Rico Electric Power Authority (PREPA) that was formed in 1941 as a “government-owned utility” with ownership of “electrical generation, transmission, and distribution systems” in Puerto Rico. In 2018, the Puerto Rico Electric System Transformation Act was passed allowing for sales of “PREPA’s generation, transmission, and distribution assets to third parties” to permit broader control of energy production including renewable energy companies. In the last 10-15 years, the trust given to PREPA by the Puerto Rican government to provide necessary electricity has diminished as a result of “deferred maintenance and having insufficient capital resources to cover long-overdue upgrades” along with inadequate defenses in advance of natural disasters hitting the island. As one example, communities on the southern coast of Puerto Rico were left without electricity for several months after the devastating damage caused by Hurricanes Irma and Maria in 2017.

== Impact of natural disasters ==
The centralized electrical system run by PREPA has faced frequent challenges as the island is located in an area where natural disasters such as hurricanes frequently occur. Starting in 2019, distributed energy resources (DERs) became an alternative that have gathered attention for their mission to provide more stable, reliable, and renewable energy to persons living in Puerto Rico. The principal form of renewable energy implemented in this distributed organization is solar power which has successfully transformed cities like Bayamón and Ponce into solar communities. Furthermore, there are calls for more energy policies to drive the country toward increased reliance on DERs as countries such as Germany and Denmark have succeeded in implementing community-based energy projects effectively. The distributed energy resources approach is one possible solution to enabling greater use of renewable energy in Puerto Rico.

== Counterweight to development of renewable energy ==
In 2018, a coalition called Queremos Sol (We Want Sun) began an initiative to make Puerto Rico’s energy production 100% renewable by 2050. In 2019, Puerto Rico’s governor, Ricardo Rosselló, signed the Puerto Rico Energy Public Policy Act which demonstrates commitment to the core objective of Queremos Sol. By contrast, the government’s Grid Modernization Plan (GMP) continues to emphasize centralized grid production of electricity from sources such as methane gas and, as a result, their actions may serve only to “[pay] lip service to demands for renewable [energies]”. As of 2020, gas is still the predominant source of electricity in Puerto Rico and accounts for 43.7% of electricity used on the island. Further, as part of the GMP, the government would like to request allocation of $20.3 billion from the Federal Emergency Management Agency (FEMA) with $12.2 billion earmarked for “the reconstruction—not transformation—of the existing [systems]”. Only $1.7 billion would be dedicated to development of DERs and microgrids with some not likely to be sourced from renewable forms of energy. An example is methane gas which is a substitute for fossil fuels used to produce energy. Methane gases emit volatile organic compounds (VOCs) like formaldehyde, benzene, and styrene and counterintuitively “produces higher greenhouse gas emissions than other fossil fuels”. Overall, local interests conflict with those of the Puerto Rican government regarding present and future energy production for the island. Moving from centralized grid to locally sourced renewable energy poses an ongoing challenge for the Puerto Rican infrastructure and its residents.
